HMS Marlborough was a first-rate three-decker 131-gun screw ship built for the Royal Navy in 1855. She was begun as a sailing ship of the line (with her sister ships , HMS Prince of Wales and HMS Royal Sovereign), but was completed to a modified design and converted to steam on the stocks, and launched as a wooden steam battleship.

Construction

As was policy at the time, to ensure the ship's timbers were well-seasoned and so resistant to rot, the partially-completed ship was held 'in frame'. In this state, her frames had all been raised and bolted to the keel, along with the basic internal structure such as deck beams, but no planking had yet been attached to the hull.

On 30 October 1852, Marlborough was ordered to be converted on the stocks to a steam battleship of 131 guns. To accommodate the engine and boilers, as well as to adapt the hull form to be better suited to steam propulsion, the hull was cut apart and stretched in three places, with 23 ft being inserted amidships, 8 ft in 'the run' towards the stern, and an additional 5 ft at the bow.

A two-cylinder, 800 nhp single-expansion steam engine—specially built for Marlborough by Maudslay, Sons and Field—was fitted into the ship, which drove a single screw propeller. As steam propulsion was considered ancillary to sail at this time, the propeller was mounted in a frame which could be hoisted up into the ship when not steaming, reducing drag and improving performance under sail.

Launching began on 31 July 1855, but the process took a whole week after the ship became stuck on the ways. Marlborough, still without masts and rigging, underwent steam trials in Stokes Bay on 12 May 1856, and recorded a speed of 11.886 kts. After completion in 1858, she was placed in the first-class steam reserve.

Career

She served as flagship of the Mediterranean Fleet from 1858–64 (with the flag of Vice-Admiral William Fanshawe Martin, captain William Houston Stewart, from 3 May 1860 to 20 April 1863; and of Vice-Admiral Robert Smart, Captain Charles Fellowes, from 1863). In 1864 she was replaced as flagship by Victoria.

She sailed back to Portsmouth to serve as a training ship for engineers (c. December 1878), and later as a receiving ship (e.g. for the Steam Reserve in c.1890, as tender to ). Whilst at Portsmouth, she was downgraded in rating to a 98 gun ship (in c. 1870).

For a time her Commander was Sir Edward Dolman Scott (1826–1905), 6th Baronet Scott of Great Barr.

In 1904, Marlborough was moved to Portchester Creek and renamed Vernon II, becoming an accommodation hulk to the HMS Vernon torpedo school. (Vernon I was the joint name for the establishment's two existing hulks, HMS Ariadne and HMS Actaeon—all three hulks were joined together by bridges.)

Fate & Legacy
In 1923, HMS Vernon was turned into a Shore Establishment, and the old hulks were no longer required. Marlborough was sold to A. Butcher for breaking up in October 1924, but capsized and sank with the loss of four men on 28 November 1924 off Selsey while being towed to the breakers at Osea Island.

Today, Marlborough'''s figurehead can be seen at the Gunwharf Quays shopping centre in Portsmouth, which was built on the site of the old HMS Vernon shore establishment.

References

Bibliography
 
 Winfield, Rif (2014) British Warships in the Age of Sail 1817–1863: Design, Construction, Careers and Fates. Seaforth Publishing. 
 Lambert, Andrew (1984) Battleships in Transition: The Creation of the Steam Battlefleet 1815-1860''. Conway Maritime Press.

External links

 http://www.pdavis.nl/ShowShip.php?id=2
 http://www.britainsnavy.co.uk

 

Ships of the line of the Royal Navy
Victorian-era ships of the line of the United Kingdom
1855 ships
Maritime incidents in 1924
Shipwrecks in the English Channel